Madawala Ulpota is a village in Sri Lanka. It is located within Central Province at 7° 37' 0" North, 80° 38' 0" East.

See also
List of towns in Central Province, Sri Lanka

External links

Populated places in Matale District